The 2006 Waterford Crystal Cup was the inaugural staging of the Waterford Crystal Cup. The draw for the fixtures took place on 20 December 2005. The cup began on 15 January 2006 and ended on 5 February 2006.

On 5 February 2006, Limerick won the cup following a 1-19 to 3-10 defeat of Waterford Institute of Technology in the final. This was their first Waterford Crystal Cup title.

Participating teams

The newly launched Waterford Crystal Cup featured five county teams and five third level college teams. The Munster Council run the competition on a similar system to the McGrath Cup.

Results

Preliminary round

Quarter-finals

Semi-finals

Final

Top scorers

Overall

References

Waterford Crystal Cup
Waterford Crystal Cup